The Ridge Hill transmitting station is a broadcasting and telecommunications facility located 8.5 miles SE of Hereford in Herefordshire, and close to the border of Gloucestershire. The station transmits the full complement of digital terrestrial multiplexes and an additional ITV West Multiplex.

Ridge Hill supplies its signal to 17 relays which allow coverage into "fringe" areas not able to receive a good signal from the main transmitter.

All 5 analogue programme channels were broadcast plus the full 6 digital MUXES although the multiplexes were scattered across the band requiring a wideband aerial for most consumers. Digital switchover was completed on 20 April 2011 where the main 6 multiplexes are now located in the Group A antenna band. Since March 2018 MUXES 7 and 8 have been moved up to channels 55 and 56 respectively which are outside the A group, though these are due to be switched off between 2020 and 2022

In addition to its television output Ridge Hill transmits various radio stations including BBC Hereford and Worcester.

The station covers the south west Midlands, including Herefordshire, and parts of Worcestershire. It also covers parts of the South West, specifically northern Gloucestershire. It does not, however, transmit BBC local programmes for Gloucestershire. These are covered by the Mendip transmitter which can be seen from the south and west of Gloucester city, and a very much smaller part of Cheltenham.

From 4 December 2006 Ridge Hill broadcast ITV1 West on UHF channel 30 (rebroadcasting the signal from Mendip) in addition to the existing ITV1 Central service on channel 25. This is known as "Ridge Hill West". This followed the restructuring of ITV Regional News and the abolition of the Central South region. As a result, the existing ITV1 Central service now carries news from the West Midlands region.

Services listed by frequency

Digital radio (DAB)

Digital television

Before switchover

Analogue television
Since April 2011, analogue television has not been broadcast from Ridge Hill. BBC2 was closed on 6 April and the remaining five services on 20 April.

See also
List of tallest buildings and structures in Great Britain
Arqiva

References

External links
 Info and pictures of Ridge Hill including co-receivable transmitters.
 Pictures of Ridge Hill from MB21 transmitter gallery.
 Ridge Hill at UK TV For Free
 Ridge Hill West at UK TV For Free
 Ridge Hill Transmitter at thebigtower.com

Transmitter sites in England